Leonardo McNish Christie (14 October 1946 – 4 December 2021) was a Guatemalan footballer who played as a defender for Malacateco, Marquense, Tipografía Nacional, Suchitepéquez, Municipal, Galcasa and Cobán Imperial, as well as the national team.

References

1946 births
2021 deaths
Guatemalan footballers
Guatemala international footballers
C.D. Malacateco players
Deportivo Marquense players
Tipografía Nacional players
C.D. Suchitepéquez players
C.S.D. Municipal players
Cobán Imperial players
Association football defenders
C.S.D. Galcasa players